SciDev.Net is a not-for-profit organisation that produces news, views and analysis about science and technology in the context of global development. It primarily engages with development professionals, policymakers, researchers, the media and the informed public.

The organisation was founded in 2001 in response to the significant gap in scientific knowledge between rich and poor countries and with the understanding that “those who stand to benefit the most from modern science and technology are also those with the least access to information about it". SciDev.Net seeks to redress this imbalance via its free-to-access website, regional networks and specialist workshops.

SciDev.Net aims to help individuals and organisations apply evidence and insights from science and technology to decision-making in order to have a positive impact on equitable and sustainable development and poverty reduction.

The global edition is based in London and there are six regional desks based in Latin America & Caribbean (Spanish), Middle East and North and West Africa (Arabic), South Asia, South-East Asia & Pacific, Sub-Saharan Africa (English and French).

SciDev.Net is a company limited by guarantee and a registered charity in England and Wales (registered charity number 1089590).

Website

The SciDev.Net website is made up of a global and six regional editions. SciDev.Net publishes in four languages: English, Spanish, French and Arabic. Content includes: News, Analysis, Multimedia, Practical Guides, Learning Series reports, Opinions editorials, Spotlights and Data Visualisations.

News: SciDev.Net's news coverage is at the heart of its website and articles are added daily. Freelance journalists throughout the developing world write much of this material and work closely with a team of editors to ensure timely and accurate coverage of breaking news.

Analysis blogs: SciDev.Net analysis blogs focus on vulnerable or marginalised groups who tend to be neglected in mainstream development journalism. They aim to bridge the gap between science and development and provide an analysis of how each can inform the other. SciDev.Net analysis blogs include: 
 Focus on Gender
 Focus on Disability 
 Focus on Migration Focus on Poverty 
 Focus on Private Sector
 View on Disability
 View on Gender
 View on Migration
 View on Private sector
 View on Poverty
Opinions: SciDev.Net opinion pieces are exclusive contributions from the world’s leading experts in science and international development. SciDev.Net has published exclusive contributions from figures such as Calestous Juma, Paul Boateng, Mark Lynas, Gordon Conway and Mariéme Jamme.

Multimedia: SciDev.Net produces original multimedia content such as videos, podcasts, photo essays, image galleries and audio-video slideshows.

Practical guides:  Written by experts in their field, practical guides help readers strengthen and learn new skills. These guides:
 Provide expert advice for journalists to sharpen their skills and improve their coverage of hot topics for print, broadcast and online media
 Help scientists with ‘how to’ guides on  getting research published, briefing policy makers and publicizing their work
 Support science communicators with tools and tactics on areas such as blogs, press releases and covering controversial issues
Spotlights: These special collections of articles focus on a ‘hot topic’ and provide an in-depth look at the key issues facing developing countries. Spotlights published to date include:
 Shelter crisis: rebuilding after the storm
 Managing health crises after Ebola
 Transforming cities for sustainability
 Making higher education work for Africa
 Big data for development
Data visualisations: Since 2014 SciDev.Net has been producing data visualisations. These interactive features transforms the latest issues in international development into accessible information that informs data-led decision making. SciDev.Net have worked with a number of partners, including SightSavers, to produce data visualisations on a wide variety of topics including:
 Mapping trachoma to eliminate blindness
 The hidden digital divide (nominated for the Kantar Information is Beautiful Awards 2015)
 Africa's hydropower future
 Urbanisation and the rise of the city

Topics and regions
The SciDev.Net website was restructured and relaunched in March 2008 to provide access to material via ‘topic gateways’, which bring together news updates and analysis on key issues. The topics covered are:
Agriculture
Environment
Health
Governance
Enterprise
Communication

Science and technology news is also available via ‘regional editions’:

Afrique Sub-Saharienne
América Latina y el Caribe
الشرق الأوسط وشمال أفريقيا
South-Asia
South-East Asia and the Pacific
Sub-Saharan Africa

Coverage is informed by regional advisory groups consisting of an extensive number of journalists, consultants, advisors and registered users based in developing countries. They work to ensure that a developing country perspective is represented.

Training 
SciDev.Net has over 15 years’ experience of specifically supporting southern journalists and researchers to communicate scientific evidence through workshops and on-the-job mentoring. Since its inception, SciDev.Net has delivered workshops for approximately 1,500 journalists.

In 2013 SciDev.Net piloted a new approach to capacity building centered upon training for trainers. The new approach provides a blend of face-to-face workshops, networking programmes, awards, mentoring and online learning for journalists, researchers and policymakers.

Signing up

Visitors who sign-up with SciDev.Net receive a free weekly and/or daily email with all the latest stories from the website. These are available for each edition English, Spanish, Arabic and French. Those who sign-up can comment on articles and submit announcements, events, jobs and grants to the noticeboard for free and these are featured on the website and in the weekly emails.

RSS feeds

The latest news can appear instantly on other websites through a free SciDev.Net global, regional or topic specific newsfeed. Each newsfeed carries the latest news stories, including a headline, introductory sentence and link to the full article.

For busy researchers or editors who need to sift through information from many sources, RSS (Really Simple Syndication) enables instantaneous delivery of SciDev.Net news stories to a 'news reader' soon as they are published.

Creative Commons 
All SciDev.Net website material is free to reproduce under a Creative Commons Attribution 2.0 licence. Under the terms of this licence users are permitted to copy, distribute, display and perform the content, and make derivative works so long as the original author and website are quoted as the source.

Hundreds of media outlets have syndicated SciDev.Net’s work including global media houses such as The Guardian, The BBC and The Thomson Reuters Foundation as well as regional news networks like AllAfrica, The Asian Scientist and Dawn.

Funders, supporters and partnerships

Funders of SciDev.Net include:

UK Department for International Development (DFID)
Swedish International Development Cooperation Agency (SIDA)
International Development Research Centre (IDRC)
The Wellcome Trust 
INASP
Carnegie Corporation

Partners 
SciDev.Net works with a range of organisations at global, regional and national levels to achieve shared objectives. These include:

Nature
Science
Guardian Environment Network
Guardian Development Network
AlertNet

SciDev.Net is also affiliated with TWAS, the Academy of Sciences for the Developing World, based in Trieste, Italy.

References

External links
 SciDev.Net official website

Free-content websites
Non-profit organisations based in London
Technology websites
Science websites
British news websites
British technology news websites
International development organizations
Organizations established in 2001